La Soirée du hockey (literally translated to The Night of Hockey) was a Canadian ice hockey television show. It was the French language Radio-Canada equivalent of the English Canadian CBC show Hockey Night in Canada. The show used "The Hockey Theme" as its theme song, like its English language counterpart. The show ran from 1952 to 2004.

Games covered
La Soirée du hockey most frequently featured Montreal Canadiens games on Saturday evenings, usually in parallel with English-language broadcasts on CBC. In later years, CBC would drop some of its split-national telecasts in the 7 p.m. ET window, resulting in a single national telecast at that time (most of the time featuring the Toronto Maple Leafs), while Radio-Canada continued to feature the Canadiens. The broadcast featured Quebec Nordiques and Ottawa Senators games occasionally during the regular season on rare occasions where the Canadiens were idle on Saturday night.

During the playoffs, SDH featured all games involving the Montreal Canadiens. After they were eliminated from further contention (or if they did not make the playoffs that season), the program usually featured series of interest to French Canadians, all the way to the Stanley Cup Finals.

2002–03 deal with Réseau des sports
Beginning with the 2002–03 season, RDS secured exclusive French language rights to the NHL. The deal, reached with the Canadiens and not directly with the league, was meant to ensure a consistent home for all Canadiens games; as a general-interest network, Radio-Canada cannot give up so much airtime to Canadiens games. The announcement drew the ire of, among others, then-Heritage Minister Sheila Copps, who suggested that the network would somehow be violating its conditions of licence by not airing La Soirée du hockey. In fact, there is no specific mention in the CBC's licence from the CRTC (or any other legal document governing the CBC) that the CBC's networks carry coverage of NHL games, nor that there be parity between the two networks' carriage of such games.

Le Hockey du samedi soir
Radio-Canada soon reached an agreement to produce the Saturday night games, to remain branded La Soirée du hockey, to be simulcast on both SRC and RDS. However, for reasons that are unclear, that agreement was terminated after the 2004 playoffs. The RDS-produced replacement, Le Hockey du samedi soir, was simulcast on SRC outside Québec, where RDS has limited distribution, through 2006.

French-language rights to NHL hockey became exclusive to RDS in 2006; the national package, including all Saturday broadcasts, then moved to TVA Sports (under sub-licence from Rogers Communications) in 2014. While Rogers has licensed the rights to the "Hockey Night in Canada" name from the CBC for its Saturday broadcasts (some of which will continue to air on CBC), there has been no indication that the rights to the "La Soirée du hockey" branding are included in that deal. Instead, TVA Sports has branded its Saturday telecasts as La super soirée LNH (NHL Super Evening) and, unlike its English language counterpart, has not offered broadcasts to Radio-Canada.

List of commentators

Radio personnel 
Rolland Beaudry (1937), play-by-play announcer
Charles Mayer (1940s–1950s), established and hosted the French language equivalent of the Hot Stove League on radio broadcasts, and made the choice of the game's three stars
Michel Normandin (1945), play-by-play announcer
Rene Lecavalier - He was also the first commentator for La Soirée du hockey. He broadcast games for the Montreal Canadiens on radio and television for over 30 years and retired in 1985.  He was as revered in French Canada as Foster Hewitt was in English Canada.
Lionel Duval , play-by-play announcer
Richard Garneau (1957–1985), play-by-play announcer
Claude Quenneville (1980), play-by-play announcer
Rene Pothier (1991), play-by-play announcer

TV play-by-play announcers 
René Lecavalier (1952–1985)
Raymond Lebrun (1973–1977)
Winston McQuade (1977–1982)
Serge Arsenault (1982–1988)
Richard Garneau (1985–1990)
Jean Pagé (1988–1989)
Camille Dubé (1989–1997)
Claude Quenneville (1990–2002)

TV colour commentators 
Jean-Maurice Bailly (1952–1970)
Gilles Tremblay (1970–1998)
Robert Pepin (1972)
Claude Mailhot (1972–1982)
Paul Larivee (1978)
Bernard Brisset (1980)
Gerard Potvin (1981)
Mario Tremblay (1986–1988)
Yvon Pedneault (1994)
Michel Bergeron (1998–2002)
Ron Fournier 
Pierre Bouchard

References

See also 
List of Quebec television series
Television of Quebec
Culture of Quebec

Television shows filmed in Quebec
National Hockey League on television
Ici Radio-Canada Télé original programming
1952 Canadian television series debuts
2004 Canadian television series endings
1950s Canadian sports television series
1960s Canadian sports television series
1970s Canadian sports television series
1980s Canadian sports television series
1990s Canadian sports television series
2000s Canadian sports television series
Black-and-white Canadian television shows